Onyx Cave, also known as King Cave and Boiling Springs Cave, is a historic natural cave located near Newburg, Pulaski County, Missouri.  The cave consists of the main room measuring approximately 85 feet wide, 250 feet long, and 33 feet high, and two passageways. The cave features translucent cave onyx that is pure white to cream in color, some with reddish-colored banding.  Formations range from the common stalactites, stalagmites, and columns, to beautiful draperies.  An 8 foot by 13 foot vertical shaft was sunk in 1892 to mine the onyx.

It was listed on the National Register of Historic Places in 1999.

References

Caves of Missouri
Buildings and structures on the National Register of Historic Places in Missouri
1892 establishments in Missouri
Buildings and structures in Pulaski County, Missouri
National Register of Historic Places in Pulaski County, Missouri